Montanna Thompson is a British actress. She is known for her role as Justine Littlewood in the CBBC children's series The Story of Tracy Beaker (2002–2006). Thompson has reprised her role as Justine in Tracy Beaker Returns (2012), My Mum Tracy Beaker (2021) and The Beaker Girls (2021–2023).

Career
Thompson's first television appearance was in 1998, in the BBC mini-series Close Relations in which she played the role of Allegra. In 2000, she went on to appear in The Queen's Nose, in which she appeared as Emily, a foster home resident.

In 2002, Thompson began appearing as Justine Littlewood in the CBBC series The Story of Tracy Beaker, based on the Jacqueline Wilson book of the same name. Justine was introduced in the first episode as the arch-enemy of the title character, Tracy Beaker (Dani Harmer). In 2012, Thompson reprised her role as Justine Littlewood in Tracy Beaker Returns. Thompson reprised her role once again in the 2021 series My Mum Tracy Beaker.

Personal life
Thompson has two sons.

Filmography

References

External links
 

Living people
British child actresses
British television actresses
Place of birth missing (living people)
Year of birth missing (living people)